Alex Michael Porter (born 5 July 1980) was an English volleyball player, commentator, and former Great Britain volleyball Captain. He also managed the Great Britain Men's Volleyball Team for the 2012 European Championship. He was a court side Expert Pundit at the 2012 Summer Olympics and Paralympics 2012 Games, covering the volleyball and sitting volleyball competitions matches held at Earls Court & ExCeL venue.

During the games he joined up with Jonathan Legard to commentate for the BBC's live coverage of the Olympic Volleyball, including the men's Gold medal match. The coverage was broadcast on BBC One, BBC Two, BBC Three and their interactive service (Red Button) BBC Red Button

Biography
Born at Colchester Hospital University NHS Foundation Trust he grew up in the village of Kirby-le-Soken he is one of three children to Electrical Engineer Ken Stephen Porter and Janice Porter. Alex initially started playing volleyball at Tendring High School (later rename Tendring Technology College) aged 11 before for joining Tendring Volleyball club later that year. In 1996 he joined his first National Volleyball League Team, Essex Estonians, who played in the Division 3. From here, he signed for London Malory who were reigning League and Cup champions. In his first session for them, he became a starting 6 player and gained his first England cap against Scotland. A knee injury at the end of the 1998–99 season meant he missed the beginning of the 1999–00 season. Halfway through the season when he recovered from surgery he signed for Malory's rivals, London Docklands. After 2 years of commuting to London from his Sheffield home he transferred to Sheffield Volleyball Club. In his first year with them they narrowly missed out on promotion to his previous team, London Docklands.
 
After finishing his university education Alex moved to Sweden to play semi-professionally in Sweden for Vingåker VK (Sweden) and then in professionally in Austria for Sokol V (Austria).

Since then Alex has given back to his local community by taking up the position of Community Development Coach. He used his experience to encourage schools to take up volleyball in the Tendring and Colchester area, working with primary and secondary schools and establishing a recreational team at Tendring Volleyball Club.

In the summer of 2011 he changed career to work in the finance industry but has still maintained his volleyball links. Working with fellow Tendring Volleyball Club coach Neil Masters, they took over the coaching roles of England South Boys Cadets and won the 2011 UK School Games and won silver at the 2012 School Games. Again working with Neil Masters, the pair of them have gained Tendring Volleyball Club's Men's team back to back promotions, from Division 3 East to Division 1. During the same period they reached the National Shield semi-final 2009–10 and the National Cup semi-final 2010–11. In 2011–12 the team won the National Shield against Boathouse Volleyball Club in front of a large crowd at the National Volleyball Centre.

Volleyball career
Combined England and GB Caps; 75 international caps

Coaching at; Head Coach EVL Tendring 2, Assistant Coach NVL Men,

Former Coaching at; Sheffield Hallam University, Vingaker Women's Team (Sweden), Sokol School (Austria), Martinus Men's 5th Team (the Netherlands)

Former Player at; Men's GB Team, Tendring, City of Sheffield, Sheffield Hallam University, London Docklands, London Malory, Vingaker VK (Sweden), Martinus (the Netherlands)

Personal life 
Alex Michael Porter married Amy Jane Gillian Seaman on 5 August 2019.

References

External links

Alex Porter player profile at London Docklands club
Volleyball article in The Telegraph with Alex Porter
Community Coach profile page
Profile page for Tendring Volleyball Club

1980 births
Living people
English men's volleyball players
English volleyball coaches
Sports commentators
People from Colchester